There were 130 parliamentary by-elections in the United Kingdom between the 1979 and 2010 general elections. In the list below, the names of the incumbent and victor and their respective parties are given. Where seats changed political party at the election, the result is highlighted: blue for a Conservative gain, red for a Labour gain, yellow for an SNP gain, orange for a Liberal, Social Democratic Party or Liberal Democrat gain and other colours for other gains.

Resignations

Where the cause of by-election is given as "resignation" or "seeks re-election", this indicates that the incumbent was appointed on his or her own request to an "office of profit under the Crown", either the Steward of the Chiltern Hundreds or the Steward of the Manor of Northstead. Accepting an office of profit under the Crown vacates the member's seat. This process is used because members of the House of Commons are not technically permitted to resign. A member who resigns in this manner may stand for re-election.

By-elections

2005–2010 Parliament
There were 14 by-elections in the 2005–2010 Parliament. Eight were in seats held by the governing Labour party, three by the Conservatives, one by the Liberal Democrats, one by an independent and one by the speaker. Eight by-elections were won by the incumbent party, including in Haltemprice and Howden where Conservative David Davis resigned to recontest his seat. Meanwhile, Blaenau Gwent was won by a second independent candidate. Labour lost four seats; two to the Conservatives, one to the Liberal Democrats and one to the SNP. The speaker's seat was regained by Labour, the party speaker Michael Martin represented before he took up the position in a previous constituency. Eight by-elections were a result of the death of the incumbent MP - five Labour MPs died, along with one Liberal Democrat, one Conservative and independent MP Peter Law.

At the dissolution of Parliament in 2010 there were three vacancies: North West Leicestershire and Middlesbrough South and East Cleveland, caused by the death of their respective Labour members David Taylor and Ashok Kumar; and Strangford caused by the resignation of the DUP's Iris Robinson.  With the close proximity of the 2010 general election, by-elections were not held in these seats. Middlesbrough South and East Cleveland and Strangford were held by Tom Blenkinsop and Jim Shannon respectively, but North West Leicestershire was won by Conservative Andrew Bridgen.

2001–2005 Parliament
There were six by-elections in the 2001–2005 Parliament. Each were in seats held by the governing Labour party, four of which were held and two won by the Liberal Democrats. Four by-elections were a result of the death of the incumbent MP.

1997–2001 Parliament
There were 17 by-elections in the 1997–2001 Parliament. Eight were in seats held by the governing Labour party, five by the Conservatives, one by the Liberal Democrats, one by Plaid Cymru, one by the Ulster Unionist Party and one by the speaker. 14 by-elections were won by the incumbent party. The Conservatives lost one seat to the Liberal Democrats, and the Democratic Unionist Party gained South Antrim from the Ulster Unionists. The speaker's seat was regained by Labour, the party speaker Betty Boothroyd represented before she took up the position. Ten by-elections were a result of the death of the incumbent MP; six were Labour, three Conservative and one was the Ulster Unionist MP Clifford Forsythe.

1992–1997 Parliament
There were 18 by-elections in the 1992–1997 Parliament. Eight were in seats held by the governing Conservative party, nine by Labour and one by the Ulster Popular Unionist Party. Nine by-elections were won by the incumbent party, all of which happened to be Labour. The Conservatives lost all eight seats in the by-elections - four to the Liberal Democrats, three to Labour and one to the SNP. The UK Unionist Party gained North Down from the Ulster Popular Unionists. 16 by-elections were a result of the death of the incumbent MP - eight Conservatives died, along with seven Labour MPs and the Ulster Popular Unionist MP Sir James Kilfedder.

At the dissolution of Parliament in 1997 there were two vacancies: Meriden, caused by the death of its Conservative member Iain Mills, and Don Valley, caused by the death of its Labour member Martin Redmond. With the close proximity of the 1997 general election, by-elections were not held in these seats. They were held by Caroline Spelman and Caroline Flint respectively.

1987–1992 Parliament
There were 24 by-elections in the 1987–1992 Parliament. Ten were in seats held by the governing Conservative party, 13 by Labour and one by the Ulster Unionist Party. 16 by-elections were won by the incumbent party. Labour lost one seat to the SNP, and the Conservatives lost seven seats; four to Labour and three to the Liberal Democrats. 20 by-elections were a result of the death of the incumbent MP - 11 Labour MPs died, along with eight Conservatives and Ulster Unionist Harold McCusker.

1983–1987 Parliament
There were 31 by-elections in the 1983–1987 Parliament. Nine were in seats held by the governing Conservative party, six by Labour and one by the Liberals. The remaining 15 were in Northern Ireland, involving the province's own political parties. 25 by-elections were won by the incumbent party, including all in Northern Ireland except one. The Conservatives lost five seats; one to Labour, two to the Liberals, and two to the Social Democrats. The Ulster Unionists lost one seat to the Social Democratic and Labour Party. 11 by-elections were the result of the death of the incumbent MP; seven were Conservatives, three Labour and one Liberal.

1979–1983 Parliament
There were 20 by-elections in the 1979–1983 Parliament. Seven were in seats held by the governing Conservative party, ten by Labour, one by the Ulster Unionists and two (in the same seat) by Irish republican parties, who do not take up their seats in the House of Commons. 13 by-elections were won by the incumbent party. The Conservatives lost four seats: one to Labour, one to the Liberals and two to the Social Democrats, and Labour lost two seats: one to the Liberals and one to the Conservatives. Meanwhile, the seat of Fermanagh and South Tyrone was won from the Independent Republican Party by Anti H-Block, a branch of Sinn Féin. 15 by-elections were a result of the death of the incumbent MP; six were Conservatives, six Labour, and the others were the Ulster Unionist Robert Bradford, the Independent Republican Frank Maguire and the Anti H-Block member Bobby Sands (who was in prison).

See also
 List of United Kingdom by-elections (2010–present)
 List of United Kingdom by-elections (1950–1979)
 United Kingdom by-election records

References

Sources
United Kingdom Election Results (David Boothroyd)
United Kingdom Elections (Keele University)
British Parliamentary By-Elections since 1945

F. W. S. Craig (1984). British parliamentary election results, 1974–1983. Chichester: Parliamentary Research Services. .
F. W. S. Craig, British Parliamentary Election Statistics 1832–1987F. W. S. Craig (1987). Chronology of British by-elections, 1832–1987''. Chichester: Parliamentary Research Services. .

1979
20th century in the United Kingdom
21st century in the United Kingdom